Jerome Robinson (born February 22, 1997) is an American professional basketball player for the Santa Cruz Warriors of the NBA G League. He played college basketball with the Boston College Eagles. He was selected by the Los Angeles Clippers in the first round of the 2018 NBA draft with the 13th overall pick.

College career
Robinson was not ranked as a high school recruit and had trouble receiving offers from Power-5 programs coming out of Needham B. Broughton High School in Raleigh North Carolina. Boston College assistant coach Scott Spinelli, who is known for finding diamonds in the rough, was the only representative of a Power-5 school to offer Robinson. As a freshman, Robinson averaged 11.7 points, 4 rebounds and 3 assists per game for the 2015-16 season. As a sophomore, he averaged 18.7 points, 4 rebounds, 3.4 assists per game. During his junior year, he averaged 20.7 points, 3.6 rebounds and 3.3 assists per game and was named All ACC First Team with 14 ACC Player of the Year votes. Additionally, he was an Associated Press honorable mention All-American. He scored a career-high 46 points in a loss at Notre Dame on February 6. After the season, he declared for the 2018 NBA draft but did not hire an agent to preserve his collegiate eligibility. On April 28, 2018 he hired an agent with CAA sports thus ending his eligibility. Robinson became the first ever lottery draft pick out of Boston College.

Professional career

Los Angeles Clippers (2018–2020)
On June 21, 2018, Robinson was selected with the thirteenth overall pick by the Los Angeles Clippers in the 2018 NBA draft. Robinson scored a career high 21 points in a win versus the Atlanta Hawks on November 17, 2019.

Washington Wizards (2020–2021)
On February 6, 2020, Robinson was traded to the Washington Wizards in a 3-team trade, involving the New York Knicks. 

On April 8, 2021, Robinson was waived by the Wizards after 38 appearances.

Santa Cruz Warriors (2022–present)
On January 5, 2022, Robinson was acquired by the Santa Cruz Warriors.

Career statistics

NBA

Regular season

|-
| align="left" | 
| align="left" | L.A. Clippers
| 33 || 0 || 9.7 || .400 || .316 || .667 || 1.2 || .6 || .3 || .1 || 3.4
|-
| align="left" | 
| align="left" | L.A. Clippers
| 42 || 1 || 11.3 || .338 || .284 || .579 || 1.4 || 1.1 || .3 || .2 || 2.9
|-
| align="left" | 
| align="left" | Washington
| 21 || 5 || 24.0 || .397 || .349 || .763 || 3.3 || 2.0 || .7 || .4 || 9.4
|-
| align="left" | 
| align="left" | Washington
| 17 || 6 || 17.9 || .295 || .262 || .800 || 2.2 || 1.5 || .7 || .4 || 4.9
|- class="sortbottom"
| align="center" colspan="2"| Career
| 113 || 12 || 14.2 || .363 || .310 || .721 || 1.8 || 1.2 || .5 || .2 || 4.5

Playoffs

|-
| style="text-align:left;"| 2019
| style="text-align:left;"| L.A. Clippers
| 5 || 0 || 9.2 || .357 || .500 || 1.000|| 1.2 || 1.4 || .4 || .0 || 3.6
|-class="sortbottom"
| style="text-align:center;" colspan="2"| Career 
| 5 || 0 || 9.2 || .357 || .500 || 1.000|| 1.2 || 1.4 || .4 || .0 || 3.6

College

|-
| style="text-align:left;"| 2015–16
| style="text-align:left;"| Boston College
| 23 || 23 || 33.4 || .429 || .381 || .643 || 4.0 || 3.0 || 1.4 || .3 || 11.7
|-
| style="text-align:left;"| 2016–17
| style="text-align:left;"| Boston College
| 32 || 32 || 34.0 || .423 || .333 || .722 || 3.9 || 3.4 || 1.7 || .4 || 18.7
|-
| style="text-align:left;"| 2017–18
| style="text-align:left;"| Boston College
| 35 || 35 || 36.0 || .485 || .409 || .830 || 3.6 || 3.3 || .9 || .1 || 20.7
|- class="sortbottom"
| style="text-align:center;" colspan="2"| Career
| 90 || 90 || 34.6 || .450 || .376 || .755 || 3.8 || 3.3 || 1.3 || .3 || 17.7

References

External links

Boston College Eagles bio

1997 births
Living people
African-American basketball players
Agua Caliente Clippers players
American men's basketball players
Basketball players from Raleigh, North Carolina
Boston College Eagles men's basketball players
Los Angeles Clippers draft picks
Los Angeles Clippers players
Needham B. Broughton High School alumni
Santa Cruz Warriors players
Shooting guards
Washington Wizards players